Mauthe is a surname. Notable people with the name include:

Carlton W. Mauthe (1907–1959), American politician and businessman
Hal Mauthe (born c. 1929), Canadian football player 
Jörg Mauthe (1924–1986), Austrian writer, journalist and broadcasting executive
Pete Mauthe (1890–1967), American football player

See also
Maute (disambiguation)
Mauthe Doog